The 2007 Sydney to Hobart Yacht Race, sponsored by Rolex, was the 63rd annual running of the "blue water classic" Sydney to Hobart Yacht Race. It was hosted by the Cruising Yacht Club of Australia based in Sydney, New South Wales. As with previous Sydney to Hobart Yacht Races, the 2007 edition began on Sydney Harbour at 1pm on Boxing Day (26 December 2007), before heading south for 630 nautical miles (1,170 km) through the Tasman Sea, past Bass Strait, into Storm Bay and up the River Derwent, to cross the finish line in Hobart, Tasmania.

The 2007 fleet comprised 82 starters, including eight international entries of which 79 completed the race and three yachts retired. Wild Oats XI became only the second yacht in Sydney-Hobart history to take three consecutive wins, the first being Morna (now called Kurrewa IV), skippered by Claude Plowman, who won in 1946, 1947, and 1948. The American yacht, Rosebud won the IRC handicap race and, thus, the Tattersall's Cup as the overall winner of the 2007 race.

2007 fleet
82 yachts registered to begin the 2007 Sydney to Hobart Yacht race. They are:

Results

Line Honours results (Top 10)

Handicap results (Top 10)

References

Sydney to Hobart Yacht Race
S
2007 in Australian sport
December 2007 sports events in Australia